Horizons-1, also known as Galaxy 13, is a geostationary communications satellite operated by Intelsat and SKY Perfect JSAT (JSAT) which was designed and manufactured by Boeing on the BSS-601 platform. It has Ku-band and C-band payload and was used to replace Galaxy 9 at the 127.0° West longitude. It covers North America, Puerto Rico, Alaska, Hawaii and Mexico.

Satellite description 
The spacecraft was designed and manufactured by Boeing on the BSS-601 satellite bus.

It had two wings with four solar panels each that used dual-junction GsAs solar cells. Its power system generated 9.9 kW of power at beginning of life and 8.9 kW at the end of its design life and had a 30-cell NiH battery for surviving solar eclipse.

It also had twelve  bipropellant thrusters for station keeping and attitude control. For North-South stationkeeping, its primary method was an electric propulsion system with four XIPS 13, with four of the chemical thrusters acting as backup. It included enough propellant for orbit circularization and 15 years of operation.

It had two  Gregorian antennas and  two gridded shaped antennas.

Its Ku-band payload is composed of twenty four active plus eight spares 36 MHz transponders powered by TWTA with an output power of 108 watts. It covers North America, Puerto Rico, Alaska, Hawaii and Mexico and is known as Horizons-1.

The C-band payload had another twenty four plus eight spares 36 MHz transponders powered by 40 watts TWTA. It covers North America, Puerto Rico, Alaska, Hawaii and Mexico and is known as Galaxy 13, which was used to replace Galaxy 9.

History 
Horizons Satellite was originally an equal share joint venture with PanAmSat. On 4 September 2001, it ordered from Boeing its first satellite, Horizons-1 / Galaxy 13. It was a  spacecraft with 24 C-band and 24 Ku-band transponders. It had a 10 kW power generation capacity and 15 years of expected life. On the same day of the satellite order, Boeing disclosed that it had received a parallel contract from PanAmSat, where the latter had exercised an existing option to launch Horizons-1 from its Sea Launch subsidiary.

It was successfully launched on 1 October 2003 at 04:03:07 UTC, aboard a Zenit-3SL rocket from the Ocean Odyssey platform stationed at the 154.0° West over the Equator in the Pacific Ocean. 100$ present.

In late 2005, PanAmSat was taken over by Intelsat who continued the joint venture.

References 

Communications satellites in geostationary orbit
Satellites using the BSS-601 bus
Spacecraft launched in 2003
Satellites of Japan
Intelsat satellites